David Lee Stenstrom (a.k.a. David Stentstrom born November 10, 1953) is an American actor. He has appeared in various shows, the best known of those roles perhaps being his work with Saban, which includes being the voice of King Mondo in Power Rangers Zeo and Hal Stewart in Masked Rider. Stenstrom has also made guest appearances on many television shows throughout his career, including General Hospital, Doogie Howser, M.D., Full House and Murder, She Wrote. He was also known for his role as Waldo the inventor on the Nickelodeon show, Out of Control.

TV roles
Doogie Howser, M.D. - Todd ("Dangerous Reunions")
Full House - Security Guard ("Up on the Roof")
Gabriel's Fire - Studio Guard ("Postcards from the Faultline")
General Hospital - Neil Johnson (1986)
Grounded for Life - Bitter Man ("The Kids Are Alright")
Homefront - NLRB Representative ("All These Things Will I Give Thee")
The King of Queens - Bill Davies ("Roast Chicken")
Masked Rider - Hal Stewart
Murder, She Wrote
Photographer ("Something Borrowed, Someone Blue")
Husband ("The Fixer-Upper")
Budding Comic ("Where Have You Gone, Billy Boy?")
Craps Player ("Love and Hate in Cabot Cove")
Out of Control
Treehouse Builder #2 ("Hurry-Up")
Waldo
Providence - Cop ("The Thanksgiving Story", parts 1 and 2)
Reasonable Doubts - Blatchley ("Graduation Day")
Sisters - Customer ("Teach Your Children Well")

Movie roles
Acts of Betrayal - Wally Fenster
Critters - Pool Player #2
Project X - Lt. Durschlag

Voice-over roles
Power Rangers Zeo - King Mondo
Power Rangers in Space - King Mondo ("Countdown to Destruction"; uncredited)
Power Rangers Lightspeed Rescue
 Demonite ("Ryan's Destiny", "Curse of the Cobra")
 Demonite Clone ("Curse of the Cobra")
Power Rangers Time Force
 Narrator ("Force from the Future, Part 1"; uncredited)
 Fearog ("Ransik Lives")

Live appearances
 In August 2010, Stenstrom appeared at the second Power Morphicon convention in Pasadena, California. Then in August 2012, he appeared at the third convention.

External links

References

1953 births
Living people
American male television actors
American male film actors
American male voice actors